Westcock is a Canadian rural community in Westmorland County, about eight kilometres southwest of Sackville. In 1866, Westcock was a farming and lumbering settlement with about 62 families, while in 1898, Westcock had 1 post office, 1 sawmill, 1 grist mill, 1 church and a population of 150.

Canadian poet and story writer Sir Charles G.D. Roberts grew up in Westcock, moving there with his family in 1861 at 1 year old and living there for the next 12 years. 
Roberts' sister, author Jane Elizabeth Gostwycke Roberts, was born there.

The Historic Sites and Monuments Board of Canada has erected a monument to Sir Charles G.D. Roberts in Westcock.

Notable people
 Elizabeth Roberts MacDonald (1864-1922), writer, suffragist

History

See also

List of communities in New Brunswick

References

Communities in Westmorland County, New Brunswick